Faure is a hamlet some 16 km south-west of Stellenbosch and 13 km north-west of Strand. Administratively it is a suburb of the City of Cape Town, and is in the Helderberg region. Nearby is the kramat or tomb of Sheik Yusuf (1626-1699), an Islamic expatriate priest. Faure is a common surname; it is uncertain after whom this place was named. It may have been named after Pieter Faure, the name of South Africa's first trawler which arrived in Table Bay in 1897.

See also
 Faure level crossing accident

References

Suburbs of Cape Town